Francis Crozier can refer to:

 Francis Crozier (1796–1848), Irish Royal Navy officer and polar explorer
 Francis Rossiter Crozier (1883–1948), Australian war records artist